Farinomalein is a natural maleimide with formula C10H13NO4 - was first isolated from the entomopathogenic fungus Isaria farinosa (Paecilomyces farinosus) - source H599 (Japan).

Farinomalein has shown potent and selective inhibition (0.15-5 μg/disk) against eight isolates of plant pathogenic Phytophthora sojae. These results suggest that farinomalein might be useful as a candidate pesticide for the treatment of Phytophthora stem rot in soybean.

Synthesis 
A simple two-stage synthesis from the γ-hydroxybutenolide compound, 5-hydroxy-4-methyl-2-5(H)-furanone, has been reported. Firstly, the furanone is oxidized to 3-isopropylfuran-2,5-dione by Dess–Martin periodinane, followed by acetic acid reflux with beta-alanine. The white powdered product has a melting point of 75-77 °C.

References 

Maleimides
Phytophthora
Carboxylic acids
Pesticides
Isopropyl compounds